The 2021 San Antonio FC season was the club's sixth season of existence. Including the San Antonio Thunder of the original NASL and the former San Antonio Scorpions of the modern NASL, it was the 12th season of professional soccer in San Antonio. The club played in the USL Championship, the second division of the United States soccer league system, and would have participated in the U.S. Open Cup, however the field of teams was reduced due to ongoing COVID-19 pandemic concerns and eventually cancelled.

Club
Coaching staff
{|class="wikitable"
|-
!Position
!Staff

|-

|-

|-

|-

|-

|-

|-

|-

|-

|-Other information

|-

Squad information

First team squad

Player movement

In

Out

Loan in

Loan out

Pre-season 

The pre-season match vs North Texas SC was announced on March 3, 2021, by NTSC. The remaining schedule was released by SAFC on March 19, 2021.

Competitions

Overall 
Position in the Mountain Division

Overview 

{| class="wikitable" style="text-align: center"
|-
!rowspan=2|Competition
!colspan=8|Record
|-
!
!
!
!
!
!
!
!
|-
| USL Championship

|-
| USL Championship Playoffs

|-
! Total

USL Championship

Group table 
Mountain Division

Results summary

Results by matchday 

Position in the Mountain Division

Matches 
The home opener vs Colorado Springs was announced on March 23, 2021. The remaining schedule was released on March 30, 2021. Home team is listed first, left to right.

Kickoff times are in CDT (UTC-05) unless shown otherwise

USL Championship Playoffs 

On October 20, 2021, San Antonio clinched a spot in the 2021 USL Championship Playoffs.

Exhibition 
On June 21, 2021, it was announced that San Antonio would host the ‘SAFC International Showcase’ featuring Mexican sides Querétaro F.C. and Pumas UNAM.

Statistics

Appearances 
Discipline includes league and playoffs play.

Top scorers 
The list is sorted by shirt number when total goals are equal.

Clean sheets 
The list is sorted by shirt number when total clean sheets are equal.

Summary

Awards

Player

Notes

References 

San Antonio FC seasons
San Antonio
San Antonio FC
San Antonio FC